Hostyle Takeover  is the fourth album from Hostyle Gospel. Hostyle Gospel Ministries released the project on October 14, 2016. The Christian hip hop group worked with Tone Jonez, Lamorax, John Givez, Gemstones, Fred Lynch, Marty B, Laquisha Burries and Jonathan Jackson on the production on this album.

Hostyle Gospel is very forthright when talking about their faith on this project and they make sure that it's conveyed that they are representing God in their music. The group also addresses social issues, their marriages, grief and hardship in their lives on this project.

Reception

Specifying in a nine star review by Cross Rhythms, Lins Honeyman responds, "Hostyle Gospel's success lies in an ability to offer up some truly creative and challenging wordplay delivered with technical brilliance and stylistic diversity.

Track listing

Music videos 

 "Skittles & Iced Tea" (featuring John Givez)  
 "Clap" (Gemstones)

Personnel

Performance 

 Hostyle Gospel - primary artists

Featured artists 

 John Givez
 Gemstones
 Lamorax 
 Tone Jonez
 Fred Lynch

Production and engineering 

 Fontaine Pizza - engineer, producer
 Raynard Glass - engineer, producer
 Demetrius Morton - producer
 King Son - producer

References

2016 albums
Hostyle Gospel albums